Neohelvibotys is a genus of moths of the family Crambidae.

Species
Neohelvibotys arizonensis 
Neohelvibotys boliviensis 
Neohelvibotys nayaritensis 
Neohelvibotys neohelvialis (Capps, 1967)
Neohelvibotys oxalis 
Neohelvibotys pelotasalis 
Neohelvibotys polingi 
Neohelvibotys saltensis

References

Natural History Museum Lepidoptera genus database

Pyraustinae
Crambidae genera
Taxa named by Eugene G. Munroe